Conopholis alpina, known as the alpine cancer-root, is an achlorophyllous (lacking chlorophyll), root parasitic plant (holoparasite).

It is native to Northern Mexico, and to the Southwestern United States in New Mexico, Arizona, Colorado, and Texas.

Varieties
Conopholis alpina var. mexicana — Mexican cancer-root.

References

External links
USDA Plants Profile for Conopholis alpina (alpine cancer-root)

Orobanchaceae
Flora of Arizona
Flora of Colorado
Flora of New Mexico
Flora of Northeastern Mexico
Flora of Northwestern Mexico
Flora of Texas
Plants described in 1847